Leen Korpershoek (29 January 1904 – 24 July 1989) was a Dutch swimmer. He competed in the men's 200 metre breaststroke event at the 1928 Summer Olympics.

References

External links
 

1904 births
1989 deaths
Olympic swimmers of the Netherlands
Swimmers at the 1928 Summer Olympics
Swimmers from Rotterdam
Dutch male breaststroke swimmers
20th-century Dutch people